John Leroy Skoberg (February 2, 1926 – August 12, 2012) was a Canadian politician. A member of the New Democratic Party, he represented the electoral district of Moose Jaw in the House of Commons from 1968 to 1972, and Moose Jaw North in the Legislative Assembly of Saskatchewan from 1975 to 1982. He died aged 86 in 2012 of dementia.

References

External links
 

1926 births
New Democratic Party MPs
Members of the House of Commons of Canada from Saskatchewan
Saskatchewan New Democratic Party MLAs
Canadian people of Norwegian descent
2012 deaths